Canice Hickey is an Irish former hurler. At club level he played with Dunnamaggin and was also a member of the Kilkenny senior hurling team. He usually lined out as a full-back. Hickey's elder brothers Tom and Noel, also lined out at club and inter-county levels.

Career

Hickey first came to prominence at juvenile and underage levels with the Dunnamaggin club before eventually joining the club's top adult team. He had just graduated from the minor grade when he won a County Intermediate Championship title in 2000. Hickey first appeared on the inter-county scene as part of the Kilkenny minor team that lost the 1998 All-Ireland final to Cork. After three years with the minor side he progressed onto the under-21 team and won an All-Ireland Under-21 Championship title in his final game in the grade in 2003. Hickey was part of the Kilkenny senior hurling team during the pre-season Walsh Cup in 2004, was released from the panel shortly after but was recalled in 2007. He would go on to line out as a substitute in four successive All-Ireland finals, winning three successive titles against Limerick in 2007, Waterford in 2008 and Tipperary in 2009. Hickey's other honours as a substitute include a National League title and four successive Leinster Championship medals.

Honours

Dunnamaggin
Kilkenny Intermediate Hurling Championship: 2000
Kilkenny Senior Hurling Championship:       1997
Kilkenny Senior Football Championship:      2000

Kilkenny
All-Ireland Senior Hurling Championship: 2007, 2008, 2009
Leinster Senior Hurling Championship: 2007, 2008, 2009, 2010
National Hurling League: 2009
All-Ireland Under-21 Hurling Championship: 2003
Leinster Under-21 Hurling Championship: 2003
Leinster Minor Hurling Championship: 1998, 1999

References

1982 births
Living people
UCC hurlers
Dunnamaggin hurlers
Kilkenny inter-county hurlers